Death's Gambit is a side-scrolling action role-playing game developed by White Rabbit and published by Adult Swim Games. It was released for Windows and PlayStation 4 in August 2018.

Gameplay

Death's Gambit is a side-scrolling action role-playing game featuring Soulslike and Metroidvania elements. The game is presented from a 2D perspective with a pixel art aesthetic.

Development and release
Death's Gambit was developed by independent studio White Rabbit. The primary inspiration for the gameplay of Death's Gambit was Metroidvania games. The development team also wanted to integrate systems from games and series they enjoyed playing such as Castlevania, Dark Souls, and Shadow of the Colossus. Castlevania games were also an influence for game's art direction, as well as Superbrothers: Sword & Sworcery EP.

The game was published by Adult Swim Games and was released for Windows and PlayStation 4 on 14 August 2018.

Death's Gambit: Afterlife
An expanded and revised edition of the game titled Death's Gambit: Afterlife was released on 30 September 2021 for Microsoft Windows, Nintendo Switch, and on 30 November 2021 for PlayStation 4, with a version for Xbox One currently in development. Afterlife featured new content including 10 new levels, over 30 weapons, 5 new bosses, and mechanical overhauls. White Rabbit released the expansion for free to new users upon receiving community feedback.

Reception

Death's Gambit received "mixed or average" reviews, according to review aggregator Metacritic. 

GameSpot's James Swinbanks praised the exploration and the story, but criticized the game's combat as being clunky. Writing for PC Gamer, Samuel Horti enjoyed the game's story, but disliked the stamina system. In a mixed review, Mike Epstein at IGN wrote, "Death’s Gambit is a very blunt attempt to fuse two beloved games, Dark Souls and Castlevania: Symphony of the Night, into one challenging 2D action-platformer. Developer White Rabbit shows a strong understanding of what made each of them great but glosses over fundamentals that all great games need, such as responsive controls and an understandable game world, and falls short of its promise."

Death's Gambit: Afterlife received greater critical acclaim than the original game, with critics citing that the game made a number of quality additions and improvements to the base game while retaining its unique qualities. Noisy Pixel reviewed the game positively, stating, "Death’s Gambit: Afterlife is the product of a dedicated team that wants to provide the best action experience possible. This revamped version offers plenty of new systems for returning fans and puts its best foot forward for new players. There’s great attention to balance in this soulslike Metroidvania that supplies enough challenging encounters and deep customization for all players to enjoy. It looks like the Afterlife ain’t so bad after all."

Notes

References

External links
 

2018 video games
Adult Swim games
Platform games]
Indie video games
Metroidvania games
PlayStation 4 games
Video games developed in the United States
Windows games
Dark fantasy video games
Matricide in fiction
Serenity Forge games